Emily Stipes Watts (March 16, 1936 – March 12, 2018) was an American educator, writer, and literary historian. In parallel with her academic career, she wrote Ernest Hemingway and the Arts (1971), The Poetry of American Women from 1632 to 1945 (1978) and The Businessman in American Literature (1982). A laureate of the Guggenheim Fellowship, she also served as chair of the Illinois Board of Higher Education.

Early life 
Emily Stipes was born March 16, 1936, in Urbana, Illinois, the daughter of Royal Arthur Stipes Jr. and Virginia Louise Schenck. She was a student at Smith College until 1956 and then at University of Illinois, where she obtained: a BA (1958), a MA (Woodrow Wilson National fellow, 1959), and a PhD for her thesis on Jonathan Edwards and the Cambridge Platonists (1963). She married Robert Allan Watts on August 31, 1958.

Career 

Stipes Watts was appointed instructor in the English language department at the University of Illinois at Urbana (1963-1967), and then assistant professor (1967-1973). In 1971, she published Ernest Hemingway and the Arts.

She was granted a John Simon Guggenheim Memorial Foundation fellowship in 1973-1974 and appointed associate professor (1973-1977), professor and director of graduate studies at the English department (1977—2005), and professor emerita since 2005. In 1978, she published The Poetry of American Women from 1632 to 1945.

Stipes Watts was appointed chairman of the Board of directors of the University of Illinois Athletic Association (1981-1983). In 1982, she published The Businessman in American Literature.

She was a member of the faculty advisory committee of the Illinois Board of Higher Education since 1984, and became its vice chairman (1986-1987), then chairman (1987-1988). Stipes Watts was also a member of the American Institute of Archaeology, the Association of Literary Scholars, Critics, and Writers, the Authors Guild, the Illinois History Society, The Philadelphia Society, Phi Beta Kappa, and Phi Kappa Phi.

Works

References

Bibliography

External links 
 Emily Stipes Watts at Goodreads Inc.

1936 births
2018 deaths
American art historians
American literary theorists
American women academics
People from Urbana, Illinois
Smith College alumni
University of Illinois Urbana-Champaign faculty
Women art historians
Women's historians
Historians from Illinois
American women historians
21st-century American women